Empire is the fourth full-length studio album by the American heavy metal band Queensrÿche, released on September 4, 1990. The album stands as Queensrÿche's most commercially successful release, reaching triple-platinum status. The primary single, the power ballad "Silent Lucidity", reached number 1 on the Mainstream Rock Tracks and number 9 on the Billboard Hot 100. "Silent Lucidity" was also nominated in 1992 for the Grammy Awards for Best Rock Song and Best Rock Vocal Performance by a Duo or Group. The album won a 1991 Northwest Area Music Award for Best Metal Recording.

In a June 2019 interview, former vocalist Geoff Tate announced his intentions to perform the entire album live in 2020 to celebrate its 30th anniversary. He also said that there will be a new 30th anniversary edition box set.

Reception
Empire has received generally positive reviews from critics since its release.

AllMusic praised the album, selecting the songs "Jet City Woman", "Empire", and "Silent Lucidity" as the album's best tracks. The review stated that the band went for "a song-oriented approach that is more art rock and less metal" with lyrics that talk about social and physical handicaps in "Best I Can" and issues such as poverty and regret in "Della Brown" and romance with "Another Rainy Night (Without You)" and "Hand On Heart". The reviewer concluded by praising the band's mature sound and the work of producer Peter Collins.

Record Collector gave the 20th anniversary edition of the album a generally positive review. The reviewer called the album a "very pleasant, but only intermittently gripping" listen, identifying the songs "Best I Can", "Silent Lucidity", and "Jet City Woman" as some of the band's best material. Comparing Empire to the band's earlier albums, The Warning and Rage for Order, the reviewer wrote that it is "a little boring". The reviewer concluded by calling the live CD accompanying the re-issue "flawless",  making it a "worthwhile reissue". PopMatters reviewer Adrien Begrand also reviewed the album's 20th anniversary release. Begrand called the album an "enigma" that's "beautifully produced and features some of the band's quintessential songs, but at the same time it's a rather bloated, conceptually scattershot piece of work containing filler that honestly has not aged very well". Begrand praised the songs "Empire", "Another Rainy Night", and "Silent Lucidity", calling them the album's best tracks, favorably comparing "Silent Lucidity" to Pink Floyd's "Comfortably Numb". Begrand had a mixed reaction to the live CD and referred to the cover of "Scarborough Fair" as being "abysmal".

Jim Farber of Entertainment Weekly was highly critical of the album. He criticized both the album's progressive metal riffs, calling them "tuneless bombast", and the dire nature of the lyrics. Farber concluded his review by calling the band members "relentless killjoys".

Track listing

Personnel 
Queensrÿche
 Geoff Tate – vocals, keyboards
 Chris DeGarmo – six-string and 12-string electric and acoustic guitars, keyboards (on "Best I Can"), lead guitar (on "Best I Can", "Jet City Woman", "Silent Lucidity", "Anybody Listening"), harmony vocals (on "Anybody Listening"), backing vocals
 Michael Wilton – six-string and 12-string electric and acoustic guitars, lead guitar (on "Empire", "Resistance", "Another Rainy Night")
 Eddie Jackson – bass, backing vocals
 Scott Rockenfield – drums, percussion

Additional personnel
 Michael Kamen – orchestral arrangements on "Silent Lucidity", conductor
 Randy Gane – answering machine message on "Empire"
 Robert Bailey – keyboards, keyboard programming

Production
 Peter Collins – producer
 James Barton — engineer, mixing at Royal Recorders Studios, Lake Geneva, Wisconsin
 Marcus Ramaer – assistant engineer
 Dan Harjung – mixing assistant
 Paul Northfield — engineer on tracks 6, 12, 14
 Neil Kernon — producer and engineer on track 13
 Tom Hall — engineer on track 13, assistant engineer on tracks 6, 12, 14
 Bob Ludwig – mastering at Masterdisk, New York

Charts

Weekly charts

Year-end charts

Certifications

See also
List of glam metal albums and songs

References

1990 albums
Queensrÿche albums
EMI Records albums
Albums produced by Peter Collins (record producer)
Albums recorded at Greenhouse Studios